Acianthera auriculata is a species of orchid plant native to Brazil.

References 

auriculata
Flora of Brazil
Plants described in 2001